Marie Joséphine Claire Prestat (1862–1933) was a French organist, pianist, composer and teacher. She was a native of Paris where she spent her entire life. She is known principally as a composer of organ and piano music, vocal works, and pedagogical texts.

Training
Marie Prestat began advanced musical studies at a young age at the Conservatoire de Paris. In 1876 - at the age of 14 - she was awarded the Conservatoire's highest diploma (Premier Prix) in Solfège.

Among her teachers at the Conservatoire were:
<LI> for harmony: Charles Lenepveu, gaining Premier Prix in 1885.
<LI> for accompaniment: Auguste Bazille, gaining Premier Prix in 1886.
<LI> for composition: Ernest Guiraud, gaining Premier Prix for fugue and counterpoint in 1889, the first female Conservatoire student to do so.
<LI> for organ: César Franck, gaining Premier Prix in 1890.

Marie Prestat was the first female Conservatoire student to gain five Premier Prix.

Later years

Teacher
Prestat's work as a teacher was recognised in 1895 by the French State awarding her the Ordre des Palmes Académiques. From that time onwards her teaching career was spent largely at the Schola Cantorum in Paris where she taught the organ (1895-7) and piano (1901–22).

Organist
By 1912 Prestat was organist of the Association des Concerts Spirituels at the Sorbonne.

References

External links 
Details of works by Marie Prestat, including some public domain scores and texts, can be found online at:
 Biblioteque Nationale de Framce (Online resource, accessed 15 May 2021).
 IMSLP Petrucci Music Library. (Online resource, accessed 15 May 2021).
 Marie Prestat. Offrande a la Vierge: Alma redemptoris mater (1914). Andrew Pink (2021) Exordia ad missam.

Composers for pipe organ
Composers for piano
French classical organists
Women organists
French women classical composers
1862 births
1933 deaths
Academic staff of the Schola Cantorum de Paris
Conservatoire de Paris alumni